This article shows the qualification phase for 2017–18 CEV Women's Champions League. A total of 14 teams entered this qualification round. During qualification, the winners keep on progressing until the last 4 teams standing join the 12 teams which have directly qualified to the main tournament League round based on the European Cups' Ranking List. All 10 teams which do not progress in qualification are allocated to the 2017–18 Women's CEV Cup.

Participating teams

1.Team entering at the 2nd round.
2.Team entering at the 3rd round.

Second round
12 teams compete in the second round.
Winners advance to the third round. Losers will compete in 16th Finals of the 2017–18 Women's CEV Cup.
All times are local.

|}
Notes 
The table displays teams (1 and 2) as per draw result.
The order of the fixtures between Minchanka Minsk and Rocheville Le Cannet was reversed, the first leg was played in France and the second in Belarus.

First leg

|}

Second leg

|}

Third round
8 teams compete in the third round.
Winners advance to the League round. Losers will compete in 16th Finals of the 2017–18 Women's CEV Cup.
All times are local.

|}

First leg

|}

Second leg

|}

References

Qualification
2017 in women's volleyball